Rabbits is a 2002 series of eight short horror web films written and directed by David Lynch, although Lynch himself refers to it as a sitcom. It depicts three humanoid rabbits played by Scott Coffey, Laura Elena Harring and Naomi Watts in a room. Their disjointed conversations are interrupted by a laugh track. Rabbits is presented with the tagline "In a nameless city deluged by a continuous rain... three rabbits live with a fearful mystery".

Originally consisting of a series of eight short episodes shown exclusively on Lynch's website, Rabbits is no longer available there. The films are now only available on DVD in the "Lime Green Set" collection of Lynch's films, in a re-edited four-episode version. The set also does not contain episode three. As of 2020, Lynch has been occasionally uploading the original episodes to YouTube. In addition, the setting and some footage of the rabbits are reused in Lynch's Inland Empire.

Description
Rabbits takes place entirely within a single box set representing the living room of a house. Within the set, three humanoid rabbits enter, exit, and converse. One, Jack, is male and wears a smart suit. The other two, Suzie and Jane, are female, one of whom wears a dress, the other a dressing gown.  The audience watches from about the position of a television set. In each episode, the rabbits converse in apparent non sequiturs. The lines evoke mystery, and include "Were you blonde?", "Something's wrong", "I wonder who I will be", "I only wish they would go somewhere", "It had something to do with the telling of time", and "no one must find out about this". The disordered but seemingly related lines the rabbits speak suggest that the dialogue could be pieced together into sensible conversations, but concrete interpretations are elusive.

Some of the rabbits' lines are punctuated by a seemingly random laugh track, as if being filmed before a live audience. In addition, whenever one of the rabbits enters the room, the unseen audience whoops and applauds at great length, much like in a sitcom. The rabbits themselves, however, remain serious throughout.

In some episodes, mysterious events take place, including the appearance of a burning hole in the wall and the intrusion of a strange, demonic voice coupled with sinister red lighting. Three episodes involve a solo performance by one rabbit, in which they recite strange poetry, as if performing a demonic ritual.

The rabbits receive a telephone call at one point, and later, at the climax of the series, a knock is heard at the door. When the door is opened, a loud scream is heard and the image is distorted. After the door closes, Jack says it was the man in the green coat. The last episode concludes with the rabbits huddled together on the couch and Jane saying "I wonder who I will be."

Production
Lynch filmed Rabbits in a set built in the garden of his house in the Hollywood Hills. Filming took place at night in order to control the lighting. Lynch says that filming Watts, Harring and Coffey with the set lit up by enormous lights was "a beautiful thing". However, the process generated a lot of noise that echoed from the surrounding hills and annoyed Lynch's neighbors. The unique use of lighting to create shadows and set an uneasy atmosphere has been praised by critics.

As with most of Lynch's films, the score was composed by Angelo Badalamenti.

Reception
Rabbits received positive reviews from viewers, who highly praised the sitcom for its lighting, sound design and scary atmosphere.

Possible influences
Dave Kehr noted in The New York Times that it was Alain Resnais who first put giant rodent heads on his actors in his 1980 film Mon oncle d'Amérique, and the rabbits' dialogue is reminiscent of Resnais' Last Year at Marienbad.

The dialogue has been compared to the writing of Samuel Beckett.

Use in Inland Empire
Lynch used some of the Rabbits footage as well as previously unseen footage featuring Rabbits characters in his film Inland Empire (2006). Lynch also used the Rabbits set to shoot several scenes involving human characters. In that film, excerpts from Rabbits appear but the rabbits are associated with three mysterious Polish characters who live in a house in the woods.

DVD release
Most of Rabbits can be found on the "Mystery DVD" in the 10-disc The Lime Green Set released by Absurda in 2008. This DVD features seven of the eight episodes, though several of the episodes have been edited together. "Episode 1" on the DVD contains "Episode 1", "Episode 2" and "Episode 4" from the website.  "Episode 2" on the DVD contains "Episode 6" and "Episode 8" from the website. "Scott" and "Naomi" are the same as "Episode 5" and "Episode 7", respectively.  "Episode 3" from the website does not appear on the disc. Presumably, this episode would have been retitled "Rebekah", as it features only one performer as with "Scott" and "Naomi". The DVD's running time is 43 minutes instead of 50 minutes like the original version. The other seven minutes consist of title and credit sequences for each individual episode that were edited out to allow it to flow as a film.

Use in psychological research 
Rabbits was used as a stimulus in a psychological experiment on the effects of acetaminophen on existential crisis. The research, in a paper entitled "The Common Pain of Surrealism and Death" suggested that acetaminophen acted to suppress the compensatory desire to affirm systems of meaning that viewing surrealism has been shown to produce.

References

Notes

References

External links

 David Lynch's Rabbits - random Rabbits episode generator in Flash

American avant-garde and experimental films
2002 films
Short films directed by David Lynch
Films about rabbits and hares
American mystery films
American independent films
Films with screenplays by David Lynch
Films scored by Angelo Badalamenti
2000s avant-garde and experimental films
2000s English-language films
2000s American films